Barney's Musical Castle, also called Barney's Musical Castle LIVE and El Castillo Musical de Barney (Spanish), was Barney's fourth concert and his second US tour. The tour began on September 8, 1999, and the video was released in 2001. In this stage show tour, Barney, Baby Bop, BJ and kids go to the forest to visit the king. The home video was taped at the Rosemont Theater.

Cast
 Barney (voice) - Bob West 
 Barney (costume) - Carey Stinson and Antwaun Steele
 Baby Bop (voice) - Julie Johnson
 Baby Bop (costume) - Jennifer Gibel and Jill Nelson
 BJ (voice) - Patty Wirtz
 BJ (costume) - Kyle Nelson and Charles Shaw
 Andy - Fernando Moguel
 Penny - Hayley Greenbauer
 Jessica - Talia Davis
 Justin - Wesley Farnsworth
 King - Ray Hallmen

Songs

Act One
 Barney Is A Dinosaur (tune: Yankee Doodle)
 Musical Castle Sing-Along Medley (Everyone is Special, If All the Raindrops and Mr. Knickerbocker)
 Castles So High
 What Makes A Flower So Pretty?
 Look At Me, I'm Three!
 You Can Count On Me
 Here In The Forest
 And The Green Grass Grows All Around 
 It's A Great Day
 If You're Happy and You Know It

Act Two
 Castles So High (reprise)  
 Wave The Flags   
 Musical Castle Nursery Rhymes Sing-Along (Little Bo-Peep, Hickory Dickory Dock, Pat-a-cake, Mary Had a Little Lamb, Jack and Jill, This Little Piggy (Rap vision))    
 Knight's Dance   
 Musical Castle Costume Parade (Noble Duke of York, A Silly Hat, and Boom Boom, Ain't it Great to Be Crazy)
 I Put A Smile On
 I'm The King
 Musical Castle Celebration Medley (Tah-Rah-Rah-Boom-De-Ay, When I'm Old Enough to Join the Band, Wave the Flags(reprise))
 It's A Great Day (reprise)
 I Love You (tune: This Old Man)

See also
 List of Barney & Friends episodes and videos

References

Barney & Friends
2000s English-language films